Edward James Patten (August 22, 1905 – September 17, 1994) was an American lawyer and politician. Patten, a Democrat, represented the now-redistricted New Jersey's 15th congressional district in the United States House of Representatives for eighteen years, lasting from 1963 until 1981.

Early life and education
Patten was born and attended public school in Perth Amboy, New Jersey. He attended Newark Normal School and graduated in 1927. That year, Patten also graduated from Rutgers Law School, and the following year, he graduated from Rutgers University. He was admitted to the bar in 1927 and began his law practice in Perth Amboy.

Career 
Patten worked as a public school teacher in the Elizabeth, New Jersey school district until 1934. He then ran successfully for Mayor of Perth Amboy, New Jersey and held that position until 1940. A year into his term as mayor, Patten became director and counsel of the Woodbridge National Bank, a position he would hold for twenty-seven years. After serving as mayor, Patten went on to become the county clerk for Middlesex County for fourteen years, until 1954. He then served as New Jersey's Secretary of State until 1962. That year, he won the Democratic primary over George Otlowski and ran for the House of Representatives seat for the new 15th congressional district, which had been created as a result of 1960 census data.

Politics
The Democratic Patten successfully ran the election, defeating Republican challenger Bernard F. Rodgers by nearly 20,000 votes. He was then elected into office for the 88th United States Congress on January 3, 1963. Patten was again challenged by Rodgers in 1964, but Patten soundly defeated him again, after receiving 63.2% of the vote. Patten would be challenged and re-elected again in 1966 against C. John Stroumtsos, in 1968 against George W. Luke, in 1970 against Peter P. Garibaldi, in 1972 against Fuller H. Brooks, in 1974 against E. J. Hammesfahr, in 1976 against Charles W. Wiley and Independent Dennis Adams Sr., and finally in 1978 in another election against Charles W. Wiley. He was not a candidate for renomination in the 1980 United States House of Representatives election for the 15th congressional district.

In his time in Congress, Patten sponsored twenty-nine bills, all related to various purposes such as Social Security, human rights, and Medicare. In 1978, Patten was accused of facilitating an illegal campaign contribution from a Korean businessman as part of the Koreagate scandal. Patten was cleared of charges by an 8–0 vote of the House Ethics Committee in October of that year.
 Patten fared far better than some of his counterparts, such as California representative Richard T. Hanna who was sentenced to six to thirty months in jail, and ended up serving one year in federal prison. In the Democratic primary, he captured 59% of the vote in a race against political newcomer George Spadoro. In the 1978 election, he beat out Republican Charles Wiley by a slim 2,836 vote margin.

After politics, he continued to remain active in the various organizations he belonged to, such as the NAACP, Eagles, Elks, Kiwanis, Knights of Columbus, and Moose International.

Death 
Patten was a resident of Perth Amboy until his death on September 17, 1994 at the age of 89.

References

External links

Edward James Patten at The Political Graveyard

1905 births
1994 deaths
Mayors of Perth Amboy, New Jersey
New Jersey lawyers
Democratic Party members of the United States House of Representatives from New Jersey
Rutgers School of Law–Newark alumni
Secretaries of State of New Jersey
20th-century American lawyers
20th-century American politicians